Bitter Lake is a small lake in northwest Seattle, Washington, USA.

Until 1913, a sawmill was located at its southwest corner. Tannic acid from logs dumped into the lake gave its water a bitter taste and the lake itself a name. The Duwamish called the lake "Blackcaps on the Sides" (Lushootseed: cHálqWadee), denoting the blackcap (Rubus leucodermis) plants that grew along the shores.

It is a glacial lake with its basin having been dug 15,000 years ago by the Puget Lobe of the Cordilleran Ice Sheet, which also created Lake Washington, Union, Green, and Haller Lakes.

The Seattle-to-Everett Interurban streetcar reached the lake in 1906, and the Bitter Lake neighborhood was annexed by Seattle in 1954.

The lake is situated between Greenwood Avenue North to the west, Linden Avenue North to the east, North 137th Street to the north, and North 130th Street to the south.   Bitter Lake drains through a piped outlet at its southeast end that eventually flows into Lake Union.

References

Landforms of Seattle
Bitter
Lakes of King County, Washington